The International Journal of Clinical Practice is a monthly peer-reviewed general medical journal. It was established in 1947 as the Medical Bookman and Historian and changed its name to Medicine Illustrated in 1949. In 1956, its name was again changed, this time to the British Journal of Clinical Practice. The journal obtained its current name in 1997. The journal is published by John Wiley & Sons and the editor-in-chief is Leslie Citrome (New York Medical College). According to the Journal Citation Reports, the journal has a 2020 impact factor of 2.503, ranking it 73rd out of 169 journals in the category "Medicine, General & Internal".

References

External links

General medical journals
Wiley (publisher) academic journals
Publications established in 1947
Monthly journals
English-language journals